Calcium silicate hydrates (or C-S-H) are the main products of the hydration of Portland cement and are primarily responsible for the strength of cement-based materials. They are the main binding phase ("the glue") in most concrete. Only well defined and rare natural crystalline minerals can be abbreviated as CSH while extremely variable and poorly ordered phases without well defined stoichiometry, as it is commonly observed in hardened cement paste (HCP), are denoted C-S-H.

Preparation
When water is added to cement, each of the compounds undergoes hydration and contributes to the final state of the concrete. Only calcium silicates contribute to the strength. Tricalcium silicate is responsible for most of the early strength (first 7 days). Dicalcium silicate, which reacts more slowly, only contributes to late strength.
Calcium silicate hydrate (also shown as C-S-H) is a result of the reaction between the silicate phases of Portland cement and water. This reaction typically is expressed as:

 
also written in cement chemist notation, (CCN) as:
 2  + 7 H →  + 3 CH + heat
or, tricalcium silicate + water → calcium silicate hydrate + calcium hydroxide + heat

The stoichiometry of C-S-H in cement paste is variable and the state of chemically and physically bound water in its structure is not transparent, which is why "-" is used between C, S, and H.

Synthetic C-S-H can be prepared from the reaction of CaO and SiO2 in water or through the double precipitation method using various salts. These methods provide the flexibility of producing C-S-H at specific C/S (Ca/Si, or CaO/SiO2) ratios. The C-S-H from cement phases can also be treated with an ammonium nitrate solution in order to induce calcium leaching, and so to achieve a given C/S ratio.

Properties
C-S-H is a nano sized material with some degree of crystallinity as observed by X-ray diffraction techniques. The underlying atomic structure of C-S-H is similar to the naturally occurring mineral tobermorite. It has a layered geometry with calcium silicate sheet structure separated by an interlayer space. The silicates in C-S-H exist as dimers, pentamers and 3n-1 chain units  (where n is an integer greater than 0) and calcium ions are found to connect these chains making the three dimensional nano structure as observed by dynamic nuclear polarisation surface-enhanced nuclear magnetic resonance.  The exact nature of the interlayer remains unknown. One of the greatest difficulties in characterising C-S-H is due to its variable stoichiometry.

The scanning electron microscope micrographs of C-S-H does not show any specific crystalline form. They usually manifest as foils or needle/oriented foils.

Synthetic C-S-H can be divided in two categories separated at the Ca/Si ratio of about 1.1. There are several indications that the chemical, physical and mechanical characteristics of C-S-H varies noticeably between these two categories.

See also

Other C-S-H minerals: 
 
  (a rare mineral from hydrothermal alteration, or an ageing product of alkali-silica reaction)
 
 
 
 

Other calcium aluminium silicate hydrate, (C-A-S-H) minerals: 
 
 
  (and also )

Mechanisms of formation of C-S-H phases:

References

Calcium compounds
Cement
Concrete
Hydrates
Inorganic compounds
Silicates
Phyllosilicates